The Deutsche Orientbank (DOB) was a German bank, founded in 1905-1906 in Berlin and merged into Dresdner Bank in 1931-1932. It was originally intended for financing ventures in the Ottoman Empire and the Khedivate of Egypt. 

In mid-1914 the Orientbank absorbed the Levantine network of Deutsche Palästina-Bank, established in the late 19th century as an earlier endeavor to develop German economic influence in the Ottoman Empire.

History

At its founding in 1905-1906, driven by banker  and his son , the new venture was sponsored by Dresdner Bank, and A. Schaaffhausen'scher Bank Association, with respective shares of 37.5 percent for Dresdner and 31.25 percent for each of the other two. It was part of a broader German push to gain influence in the Ottoman Empire, also involving Deutsche Bank and the financing of the Berlin–Baghdad railway.

Initially the Orientbank was kept out of major deals by the dominant alliance of Deutsche Bank and the Imperial Ottoman Bank, but gained influence following the Young Turk Revolution in 1908. In addition to the Berlin head office and the branches in Constantinople and Hamburg, by 1913 it had opened in Adana, Bursa, Dedeağaç, and Mersin. It also opened six branches in Egypt; in Tangier and Casablanca at the request of the German government; and briefly in the Balkans. Following the establishment of the French protectorate in Morocco in 1912, the Orientbank sold the two branches there in 1913 to Société Générale. In mid-1914, Orientbank took over the branch network of Deutsche Palästina-Bank (DPB), which had been established in Berlin in 1896-1899 with branches and offices in Jaffa, Jerusalem, Gaza and later in Beirut (1907), Damascus and Tripoli (1910), and Alexandretta (1913). The German business of DPB was separately restructured by the Nationalbank für Deutschland.

During World War I, the activity of the Orientbank's in Egypt was suspended by the British authorities. In 1916, the Schaaffhausen'scher Bankverein withdrew from the Orientbank, selling its shares to a consortium of German and Austrian-Hungarian banks. After the war, the bank's Levantine network was liquidated by the Public Custodian of Enemy Property under British rule.

By 1919-1920, it had branches in Constantinople (main branch in Sirkeci and branch offices in Galata, Pera, and Kadıköy); in Adana, Bursa, Edirne, and Mersin; in Aleppo in Syria; and in Egypt in Alexandria, Beni Suef, Cairo, Damanhur, Mansoura, Minya, and Tanta.

The European banking crisis of 1931 led to the collapse of the Orientbank's two main shareholders, namely Dresdner and Danatbank (as Nationalbank für Deutschland had merged with Darmstädter Bank in 1922), and to an incipient subsequent bank run on the Orientbank itself. Following the two German banks' merger and rescue, the newly strengthened Dresdner Bank took over the Orientbank's Egyptian branch network. Dresdner also became sole owner of Orientbank in Turkey, but kept operating it under the Orientbank brand name. The Orientbank was involved in Nazi transactions in stolen gold, for which Istanbul was a hub, and was eventually liquidated in 1946.

Buildings

The head office in Berlin was successively at Markgrafenstrasse 56, then Französische Strasse 29. Following a major renovation in 2021, it has become the Orientbank Hotel Istanbul.

See also
 Banque de Salonique
 National Bank of Turkey

Notes

Defunct banks of Germany
Defunct banks of Turkey
Dresdner Bank